Amalananda  was a south Indian Sanskrit scholar who lived during the reign of Mahadeva, the Yadava ruler of Devagiri who ruled from 1260 to 1271. Not much is known about his life and background. Anubhavānanda is believed to have been his preceptor.

Amalānanda wrote Vedānta Kalpatarū sometime before 1297. This book is a commentary on  Bhāmatī  of Vācaspati Miśra which text in its own turn is a commentary on Sankara's commentary on the Brahma Sutras of Badarayana. His other works are – Śastra-darpana which is explanations of the Brahma Sutras, and Pancapādikā-darpana which is a commentary on Padmapādācārya's Pancapādika. The language of these works is chaste and the thought-content is serious. Vācaspati Miśra, the author of Bhāmatī lived around 841.  Appayya Dikshita (1520–1593), son of Rangarājādhvarindra of Kānci, and a prolific writer, wrote his Kalpataruparimala, a commentary on Amalānanda's Vedanta-Kalpataru.

Sankara explains Yadrecchāvadā, referred to by the Shvetashvatara Upanishad, as the doctrine of accidental effects which are due to chance; Amalānanda explains it as the doctrine that effects are produced at any time depending on definite causes. The same Upanishad mentions nature (svabhava) as the cause of the world. Sankara explains it as the natural powers inherent in different things. Amalānanda explains nature as that which exists so long as things exists e.g. breathing as the nature of the living body exists so long as the body exists.

References

13th-century Indian philosophers
Advaitin philosophers
Indian logicians
Indian Medieval linguists
Medieval Sanskrit grammarians
Hindu philosophical concepts
Vedanta
Advaita Vedanta
13th-century Indian mathematicians
Indian Sanskrit scholars